Heather Burns is an American actress, known for her role as Miss Rhode Island Cheryl Frasier in the 2000 film Miss Congeniality and its 2005 sequel, Miss Congeniality 2: Armed and Fabulous. Her other film appearances include You've Got Mail (1998), Two Weeks Notice (2002) and Bewitched (2005).

Life and career
Burns was born in Chicago, Illinois. She graduated from Evanston Township High School. She is a graduate of New York University's Tisch School of the Arts. Her father Jim Burns played basketball for the Chicago Bulls, and as an attorney was the US Attorney in Chicago from 1992-1996. 

Burns has appeared in a number of films with Sandra Bullock, including Miss Congeniality (2000), Two Weeks Notice (2002) and Miss Congeniality 2: Armed & Fabulous (2005). She also starred in the film What's Your Number? (2011) and she held a recurring role opposite Zach Galifianakis in the HBO series Bored to Death and played Trish in the Amazon webseries Sneaky Pete (2017).

In 2020, she appeared as a guest star in the Netflix series The Politician, for which she received praise for her performance.

Personal life
Burns is married to actor Ajay Naidu.

Filmography

Film

Television

References

External links

Living people
Actresses from Chicago
American film actresses
American soap opera actresses
American television actresses
Tisch School of the Arts alumni
20th-century American actresses
21st-century American actresses
Evanston Township High School alumni
Year of birth missing (living people)